Brandon Douglas (born June 21, 1968) is an American actor. He first came to prominence in the television series Falcon Crest, in which he played Ben Agretti during the 1988–1989 season. He played Wayne Jones in an episode of the TV series Northern Exposure and Dr. Andrew Cook in the series Dr. Quinn, Medicine Woman. Other credits include 21 Jump Street, Matlock, Murder, She Wrote, and JAG. He also costarred as Cameron Frye in the sitcom Ferris Bueller.

Douglas played the lead in The Children of Times Square, a 1986 TV movie directed by Curtis Hanson. He also starred in Papa Was a Preacher (1985).

Douglas was born Brandon Sokolosky in Oklahoma City, Oklahoma and raised in Dallas, Texas. He previously was married to actress Julie Condra.

References

External links
 

1968 births
American male film actors
American male television actors
Living people